Jamshedpur Football Club is an Indian professional football club based in Jamshedpur, Jharkhand, that competes in the Indian Super League, the top flight of Indian Football. Founded in 2017, the club debuted in Indian Super League during the 2017–18 season. The club is owned and managed by Tata Steel.

The club was established on 12 June 2017, when Tata Steel won the bidding rights for one of the two expansion slots in the Indian Super League. They won the ISL League Winners' Shield during 2021–22 season.

History

Formation

On 11 May 2017, Indian Super League organisers invited bids for new teams (Ahmedabad, Bangalore, Cuttack, Durgapur, Hyderabad, Jamshedpur, Kolkata, Ranchi, and Siliguri) in order to expand the league in the upcoming season. The bidding ended on 25 May 2017 and the external validator, appointed by the league, started scrutinizing the bids. Two weeks later, on 12 June, it was officially announced that Bengaluru FC and Tata Steel had won the bids for the new teams Bengaluru and Jamshedpur respectively.

After winning the bid, Tata announced on 14 July 2017 that the inaugural head coach for the Jamshedpur franchise would be Steve Coppell, who led the Kerala Blasters to the final in the previous ISL season. The team's official name, Jamshedpur FC, and logo were revealed nine days later, on 23 July, before the 2017–18 ISL Players Draft. Being a brand new club, Jamshedpur FC had the very first pick during the players draft. India international Anas Edathodika was the club's first draft pick, thus the first player in Jamshedpur's history.

Inaugural season

Jamshedpur began playing in November 2017. The team played their first-ever match on 18 November 2017 against NorthEast United at the Indira Gandhi Athletic Stadium. Despite being disadvantaged through defender André Bikey being sent off, Jamshedpur managed to hold on for a 0–0 draw. After another goalless draw in their next match, Jamshedpur played their first official home match on 1 December against the reigning champions ATK. Over 23,000 fans came to support the side at the JRD Tata Sports Complex but once again, the team failed to do more than draw 0–0. Finally, in their fourth match, away at Delhi Dynamos, Jamshedpur managed to earn their first victory. The club won 1–0 with Izu Azuka becoming the first-ever Jamshedpur goal scorer.

By the halfway point of the season, Jamshedpur had only managed two victories in the season including four draws and three defeats. This meant the team was in seventh place, six points off the playoff spots. Fortunes changed for Jamshedpur during the second half of the season and on 4 March 2018, the club played their final match of the Super League season at home against Goa with Jamshedpur needing a victory in order to qualify for the finals. Unfortunately, despite having home advantage, Jamshedpur fell 3–0 and thus failed to qualify for the finals in their first season.

2018–19 season 

Jamshedpur FC appointed Cesar Ferrando as their new head coach ahead of the 2018–19 season and made some overall changes to their squad. Michael Soosairaj, Sergio Cidoncha, Carlos Calvo and Mario Arques were some of the new signings along with Tiri, Memo, Subrata, and Farukh, who were retained from the last season. The club also made one of the high profile signings in the league’s history as they roped in Tim Cahill to their squad. The team had a decent start in the season as they won against Mumbai City and had as draw against Bengaluru FC at home. They were about to make it into the play-offs, but narrowly lost out on the play-off spot to NorthEast United and finished 5th in the table just like their inaugural season. In Hero Super Cup, which took place at Bhubaneswar, they were given a walkover against Churchil Brothers in the round of 16. In the next round, they lost against FC Goa and were knocked out of the tournament.

2019–20 season
Jamshedpur FC appointed Antonio Iriondo as their head coach ahead of the 2019–20 season of Indian Super League. 
As in the previous season, they signed some new players like C.K. Vineeth, who was the highest Indian goalscorer of Kerala Blasters. Among the foreign players, they signed Aitor Monroy, Sergio Castel and Francisco Medina Luna and retained their core players like Tiri. Some of the young Indian players like Narender Gahlot and Amarjit Singh Kiyam were bought into the team
Jamshedpur had an impressive start as they were unbeaten in the first 3 matches like in the previous two seasons. They started their season by defeating Odisha FC 2–1. They won against Hyderabad FC 3–1 in their second match and had a goalless draw against Bengaluru FC. The team had their first defeat of the season against ATK in an away match where the match ended 3–1. It took some more games for the club to get their third win of the season as they defeated FC Goa. The team then had three back to back draws followed by three back to back defeats against Mumbai City FC, Odisha FC and Bengaluru FC.  Unlike the previous two seasons, the club had a disappointing season as they were only able to finish eight place in the table. With eight defeats, they had the second most defeats along with NorthEast United FC and only had 4 wins during the season.

2020–21 season
After a disappointing season, the club made some major changes at their helm as they appointed Owen Coyle, who led the struggling Chennaiyin FC into the ISL final in the last season. They made a total of twelve signings ahead of the season. Changes in the squad including releasing most of the Indian players from the squad. Among the foreign players only Aitor Monroy and David Grande was retained. The club roped in the last season’s joint top scorer Nerijus Valskis.  They signed  and former Nigerian International  in their defence. Brazilian  and Australian  were the other signings ahead of the season. Jackichand Singh was one of the major Indian signings along with the players like T.P Rehenesh, Laldinliana Renthlei and Ricky Lallawmawma.

Due to the COVID-19 pandemic, the 2020–21 season were decided took place behind the closed-doors across three venues in Goa. Tilak Maidan Stadium in Vasco da Gama was selected as the home ground of Jamshedpur FC.

2022–23 season

After a record-breaking season on 22 March 2022 club officially announced that Head Coach, Owen Coyle won’t be continuing his journey at Jamshedpur. The club released an official statement stating 
Jamshedpur FC Head Coach, Owen Coyle officially announced today that he won’t be continuing his journey in India in the next season of Hero Indian Super League. The Scotsman had a successful two years with the club which he continuously kept on improving with his smart signings, promotion of young players and amazing man-management skills. He lifted the Jamshedpur side to 6th place in 2020-21, just 4 points shy off the top-4 places and later in 2021-22 propelled them to the top of the table with a historic Hero ISL League Shield Winners’ campaign where his team smashed and steamrolled upon records. 

On 10 July 2022, Aidy Boothroyd was appointed as head coach of Jamshedpur. He said: Jamshedpur FC are the Champions of India currently and the city has a tremendous football legacy. We want to continue this upward trajectory and make the club reach places and win honours that our fans are dreaming of. We want to take the club to the next level and to compete really with the top teams of Asia. 

On 14 July 2022 Jamshedpur FC confirm the extension of Leslie Cleevely as Goalkeeping Coach of the club. The world-famous Goalkeeping Coach, fondly called ‘Les’, has signed upto May 2023 and will join Aidy Boothroyd’s coaching staff. When asked about his thoughts on extending his stay at Jamshedpur after a successful season, Leslie happily stated, When I received the offer to come back as goalkeeping coach and defend our Hero ISL league title, it didn’t take any persuasion. I’m looking forward to getting to work with our exciting roster of goalkeepers and of course Aidy Boothroyd who is a fantastic coach and the right man for the job. 

On 16 July 2022 club appoints Stuart Watkiss as Assistant Coach. Upon signing for the ISL League Shield winners Stuart opined his ambition with JFC, It's a big job at Jamshedpur FC, the defending Champions of India. I come with the aim to help the club win back-to-back league titles and also help bring more honours. Along with a top Head Coach like Aidy Boothroyd, the club aims for the maximum and we will take it one game at a time. Looking forward to it.

Stadium

They play their home games at JRD Tata Sports Complex, popularly known as "The Furnace". The stadium was named after the former chairman of the "Tata Group", Bharat Ratna J. R. D. Tata.
The stadium was originally built in 1991, with a capacity for 60,000 spectators. In 2017, the stadium was renovated with the capacity of 24,424 (limited capacity for ISL games) – 40,000 (for other sports).

Supporters
The Red Miners are the official supporters group of the club which was founded in 2017 along with the inception of the club. The players and the coach have often acknowledged the fans' support in the success by calling them The 12th Man.

Crest and colours
The outer circle of the crest features the name of the club written in English and tribal symbols, paying tribute to the tribal history of Jharkhand state.

In 2017, Jamshedpur signed a deal with Nivia Sports as their official kit sponsors from the 2017–18 season. Nivia Sports is the official kit sponsor of Jamshedpur FC.

Kit manufacturers and shirt sponsors

Players

Current squad

Reserve Team and Youth Academy Players

Out on loan

Personnel

Current technical staff

Corporate hierarchy

Statistics and records

Season by season

Managers statistics

Honours

Domestic
League
 Indian Super League
Premiership: 2021–22

Cup
 Bodousa Cup
Runners-up (1): 2018

Training facilities

JFC Training Center (also known as the "Flatlet") is the training and relax center for Jamshedpur FC, located in Kadma, Jamshedpur. Besides the training field, the building comes with a fully equipped cross-fit gym, a swimming pool, and recreation centers. The project is lined with the vision of the club, where international-level training equipment would be available to the players. After its design plans were approved in April 2018, the groundbreaking ceremony of the all-weather training arena was held on 25 November 2017.

Jamshedpur FC have a robust set-up in youth development with their grassroot-level activities and the Tata Football Academy (now known as Jamshedpur FC Academy). The academy was awarded four stars in 2019–20 season by AIFF.

eSports
The organizers of ISL introduced eISL, a FIFA video game tournament, for the ISL playing clubs, each represented by two players. Jamshedpur FC hosted a series of qualifying games for all the participants wanting to represent the club in eISL. On 20 November the club announced the signing of the two players.

Roster

See also
 List of football clubs in India

References

External links

 

 Jamshedpur FC at the ISL official website

Association football clubs established in 2017
Football clubs in Jamshedpur
Indian Super League teams
 
Tata Steel
Works association football clubs in India
2017 establishments in Jharkhand